School Days is a solo album by jazz fusion bassist Stanley Clarke, released in 1976. The album reached number 34 on the Billboard 200 chart and number 2 on the Jazz Albums chart.

Unreleased quadraphonic version
In his book Abbey Road to Ziggy Stardust, record producer Ken Scott explains that the album was intended for release in 4-channel quadraphonic sound in 1976. However, at the last minute the record company decided to release only a standard 2-channel stereo version instead. This required Scott to create a "fold down" version from the 4-track mixes for the stereo release. The original quadraphonic version may still exist in the record company vault, but it has never been issued.

Critical reception

Dave Thompson, in Funk, called the album a "masterful set dominated by its eight-minute title track."

Track listing
All tracks composed by Stanley Clarke.

Side One
 "School Days" – 7:51
 "Quiet Afternoon" – 5:09
 "The Dancer" – 5:27

Side Two
 "Desert Song" – 6:56
 "Hot Fun" – 2:55
 "Life Is Just a Game" – 9:00

Personnel
 Stanley Clarke – electric bass guitar (1, 3, 5, 6), vocals (1, 6), handbells (1), acoustic piano (2, 3), piccolo bass guitar (2, 3, 6), humming (3), acoustic bass (4, 6), gong (6), chimes (6), arranger, conductor, producer
 George Duke – keyboards (6)
 Ray Gomez – electric guitar (1, 3, 5), rhythm guitar (3)
 Icarus Johnson – acoustic guitar (6), electric guitar (6)
 John McLaughlin – acoustic guitar (4)
 David Sancious – keyboards (1), Minimoog (2, 3), organ (3), electric guitar (5)
 Gerry Brown – drums (1, 3), handbells (1)
 Billy Cobham – drums (6), Moog 1500 (6)
 Steve Gadd – drums (2, 5)
 Milt Holland – percussion (3), conga (4), triangle (4)
 Tom Malone, Dave Taylor – trombone
 Jon Faddis, Alan Rubin, Lew Soloff – trumpet
 Earl Chapin, John Clark, Peter Gordon, Wilmer Wise – horns
 Al Aarons, Stewart Blumberg, George Bohanon, Buddy Childers, Robert Findley, Gary Grant, Lew McCreary, Jack Nimitz, William Peterson, Dalton Smith - brass
 Marilyn Baker, Thomas Buffum, David Campbell, Rollice Dale, Robert Dubow, Janice Gower, Karen Jones, Dennis Karmazyn, Gordon Marron, Lya Stern, Ron Strauss, Marcia Van Dyke, John Wittenberg – strings

Production
 Lynn Dreese Breslin  – art direction
 Bob Defrin  – art direction
 Ken Scott  – producer, engineer, remixing
 Jerry Solomon  – assistant engineer
 Ed Thacker  – assistant engineer
 Michael Frondelli  – assistant engineer

References

1976 albums
Stanley Clarke albums
Albums recorded at A&M Studios
Albums produced by Ken Scott
Albums recorded at Electric Lady Studios
Albums produced by Stanley Clarke
Epic Records albums
Jazz-funk albums